Jeanne Tercafs (1898–1944) was a Belgian artist.

Biography 
Tercafs was born in 1898. She was married to Alexis Bertrand.  She studied at the Académie royale des beaux-arts de Liège and the Académie Royale des Beaux-Arts in Brussels. In 1935 she applied for and received from the grant from the Belgium Ministry of Colonies to travel to the Congo. She was the first woman to receive a grant of this type. From 1935 through 1940 she made 3 trips to the Belgian Congo (now the Democratic Republic of the Congo). Tercafs died in 1944.

Gallery

References

External links

images of Tercafs' work on Invaluable
images of Tercafs' work on ArtNet

1898 births
1944 deaths
19th-century Belgian women artists
20th-century Belgian women artists